Parbatipur is an upazila (sub-district) of the Dinajpur District in northern Bangladesh, part of the Rangpur Division. It is home to the only mine in Bangladesh, the Barapukuria Coal Mine.

History

The present-day area of Kholahati was the site of a small kingdom ruled by a local Raja called Kichak Rājā. Kichak's fort remains a place of interest in Parvatipur. Kichak had a daughter called Payravati (পায়রাবতী) or Parvati. Parvati was a child widow, and was once kidnapped by miscreants and taken to the nearby dighi (reservoir) of Dimali where she was assaulted in a dishonorary manner. She later committed suicide by drowning herself in the lake, and in her honour, the area was named by others as Parbatipur. Another theory suggests that the area was named after a Hindu deity known as Parvati, as the area was formerly home to a large Hindu population.

In 1800, the British colonials established a thana in Parbatipur. The settlement of large numbers of Santals was promoted during this period. Following the Partition of India in 1947, a large number of Indian Muslims (mainly Bihari Muslims) migrated to East Bengal and settled in Parbatipur where they gained prominence as an influential community. During the Bangladesh Liberation War of 1971, 300 locals were mass murdered by the Pakistan Army and its collaborators in the areas of Peyadapara, Ramkrishnapur and Baghbari on the south of the Badarganj and Kholahati railway lines on 8 April. One of those murdered was Mohammad Shamshad Ali, a Bihari pharmacist who had supported the 1969 uprising. One of Parbatipur's martyred freedom fighters was Captain Mahbubur Rahman, and the Kholahati Cantonment was later renamed to his name following the war.

As part of the President of Bangladesh Hussain Muhammad Ershad's decentralisation programme, Parbatipur Thana was upgraded to an upazila in 1983. On 13 January 1985, a fire broke out on the Samanta Express train from Khulna to Parbatipur, and passengers pulled out the communication cord but the driver did not stop, apparently because robbers operate in the area. 27 people were killed with at least 58 injured, but news reports stated that 150 or more were killed.

Geography

It has 53,146 households and a total area 395.1 km2.

The upazila bounded by Saidpur upazila on the north, Phulbari (Dinajpur) and Nawabganj upazilas on the south, Badarganj upazila on the east, Chirirbandar upazila on the west.

Demographics

As of the 1991 Bangladesh census, Parbatipur had a population of 270,904. Males constitute 51.46% of the population, and females 48.54%. Upazila's population of people eighteen years old or older is 139,294. Parbatipur has an average literacy rate of 29.7% (7+ years), compared to the national average of 32.4%.

The majority-Bengali Muslim people of Parbatipur speak the Dinajpuri dialect with the official language being Standard Bengali. There are also speakers of English, Urdu and Santali, with the latter two being spoken by the Stranded Pakistani and Santal population.

Administration

Parbatipur, primarily formed as  Thana in 1800 and it, turned into an upazila in 1983.

Parbatipur Upazila is divided into Parbatipur Municipality and ten union parishads: Belaichandi, Chandipur, Habra, Hamidpur, Harirampur, Mominpur, Monmothopur, Mostofapur, Polashbari, and Rampur. The union parishads are subdivided into 157 mauzas and 230 villages.

Parbatipur Municipality is subdivided into 9 wards and 36 mahallas.

Chairmen

Education
Parbatipur has many schools and colleges like,
 Harirampur High School
 Alo Kingdergarten And Residencial Model School, Parbatipur, Dinajpur.
 Moniria High School, Parbatipur, Dinajpur
 Parbatipur Adarsha Degree College
 Cantonment Public School & College BUSMS
 Parbatipur Degree College
 Kholahati Degree College
 Cantonment Board High School, BUSMS
 Parbatipur Agriculture College
 Parbatipur Mohila Agriculture College
 Manmathpur Ideal Degree College
 Janankur Pilot High School.
 Parbatipur Girls Pilot High School.
 Parbatipur Govt. Technical School & College
 Parbatipur Balika Biddapit School.
 Ainul Huda Fazil Madrasah ,Ainul Huda (5250), Parbatipur, Dinajpur.
 Parbatipur Mohila Degree College
 Ambari M. L High School
 Barnamala Niketon High School & College, Parbatipur, Dinajpur.
 Mitaly high school Parbatipur, Dinajpur.
Shohid srity gov. primary school , Parbatipur, Dinajpur.

Economy and tourism
Parbatipur is home to numerous tourist sites. The ancient fort of Kichan Raja, a former local sovereign, can be found in Kholahati, Palashbari Union. Other places include the Harirampur Mound, Hirajira's Bhita, the Pancharatna Fort of Deol in Manmathpur Union and Habra Site.

Parbatipur is the focal point of the northern railway connection with different parts of Bangladesh. A four-way railway has been laid here. Therefore, it is one of the largest railway junctions and the pride of the factory and the upazila with bright potential in mineral resources. The Parbatipur Junction connects the area to the Burimari–Lalmonirhat–Parbatipur line. The Barapukuria coal mine is the only mine in Bangladesh. A part of the Saidpur Airport is in Parbatipur Upazila.

Notable people
 Abdullah el Baqui, Islamic scholar, writer and politician
 AZM Rezwanul Haque, politician
 Jumbo, film actor
 Lutfullah al-Majid, former Minister of Fisheries and Livestock
 Mohammad Shamshad Ali, pharmacist
 Muhammad Abdul Bari, Islamic scholar, writer and teacher
 Sardar Mosharraf Hossain, politician
 Syed Abdus Samad, footballer

See also
 Upazilas of Bangladesh
 American Camp
 LAMB Hospital, Bangladesh

References

Parbatipur Upazila